Dragovanja Vas is a small settlement southwest of Črnomelj in the White Carniola area of southeastern Slovenia. The area is part of the traditional region of Lower Carniola and is now included in the Southeast Slovenia Statistical Region.

The local church, built on the southern outskirts of the village, is dedicated to Saint Oswald and belongs to the Parish of Dragatuš. It was first mentioned in written documents dating to 1526, but owes its current Baroque look to a major remodelling in the 18th century. The main altar dates to 1876.

References

External links
Dragovanja Vas on Geopedia

Populated places in the Municipality of Črnomelj